This is a list of inactive Drum Corps International member corps and non-member corps.

27th Lancers Drum and Bugle Corps 

The 27th Lancers Drum and Bugle Corps was an Open Class (now World Class) competitive junior drum and bugle corps. Founded in 1967 in Revere, Massachusetts by George Boniglio and his wife Patsy,  the 27th Lancers performed in Drum Corps International (DCI) competitions and were one of the founding members of DCI. The corps was a 11-time Top 12 Finalist at the DCI World Championships but went inactive after the 1986 season.

They were invited to the 1980 Winter Olympics and played for the opening and closing of the Winter Olympics.

A large group of alumni reunited to form the 27th Lancers Alumni Corps and performed the corp's popular version of the song Danny Boy at the 1994 DCI Championships.

Argonne Rebels Drum and Bugle Corps 

The Argonne Rebels Drum and Bugle Corps (also known as "Argonne" or "The Rebels") were an Open Class (a distinction now known as World Class) competitive junior drum and bugle corps.  Based in Great Bend and Barton County, Kansas, the Rebels were one of the thirteen founding member corps of Drum Corps International, taking fifth place in 1972.

In August 1947, musician John Taff and the Rev. Joseph Tockert of the St. Rose Catholic Church started a drum and bugle corps for the Boy Scouts and Girl Scouts of the St. Rose Parish to operate under the sponsorship of the Knights of Columbus.  The corps had its first public performance on November 26, 1947.  When American Legion Argonne Post 180 took over the corps' sponsorship in 1949, membership was opened to all area youth, and the name was changed in recognition of the Legion Post, which had been named after the Argonne Forest, the site of major U.S. military action during World War I.  In 1955, Bill and Mary Lou Fryberger became the corps directors for several years.  Shortly after the Frybergers left, Glenn Opie became the corps director, a post he would hold through 1973.  In 1974, Jenny and Bob Allford were co-directors of Argonne.   H.Gene Specht became the director in 1975 and 1976.   Jerry and Jan Becker became corps directors in 1977 and would continue until Argonne folded in 1988.

Argonne competed with others in the Great Plains area in the 1950s and 1960s. They also competed in numerous VFW and American Legion, championships, and, in 1955, the Rebels won the first of thirteen Kansas State American Legion championships.  From the mid-1950s, Argonne was also a major corps on the national scene.  They were a finalist in the American Legion Nationals in 1955, 1956, 1961, 1963 (when they finished in tenth place after being attacked by a group of white supremacists in Birmingham, Alabama, on their way to Miami because the corps had African-American members), 1965, 1971, and 1972; a finalist at VFW Nationals each year from 1968 through 1972; and were Legion National Champions in 1971, 1972, and 1973. (The 1973 Legion national convention was held in Hawaii; since few if any drum corps were willing to travel there for the Nationals, they were not held that year, and the Argonne Rebels were awarded the championship by proclamation.)

In 1971, two organizations were started with the intent of giving drum corps more control over their activity, which was then largely governed by the veterans organizations.  The Midwest Combine was made up of the Blue Stars, Cavaliers, Madison Scouts, Santa Clara Vanguard, and the Troopers; and the  United Organization of Junior Corps (also known as the "Alliance"), was formed by the 27th Lancers, Garfield Cadets, Boston Crusaders, Blessed Sacrament Golden Knights, and Blue Rock.  In 1972, the ten corps from the Midwest Combine and the Alliance were joined by the Anaheim Kingsmen, the De La Salle Oaklands, and the Argonne Rebels as founding members of Drum Corps International (DCI), which remains as the sanctioning body for junior corps in North America.  At the first DCI World Championships, held in Whitewater, Wisconsin on August 17 and 18, 1972, the Argonne Rebels finished in fifth place.   The brass was instructed by Sandra Opie and was considered to be the premier brass section in drum corps; on several occasions, they received a perfect score of 5.0 for Content Analysis. Both Glenn Opie and Sandra Opie are in the Drum Corps International Hall of Fame.

In 1973, the expectations for Argonne were extremely high; not only had the corps finished in fifth place at DCI, but most of the members would be returning for the new season.  When the expected new musical arrangements were not received from the arranger, the corps turned to Frank Minear, lead trumpeter for the Stan Kenton band, who had offered to write charts for the corps.  Minear's arrangements of "Fanfare For The New" and "Málaga" were transcriptions straight from the Kenton band's arrangements.  When combined with Ken Norman's arrangement of "Stars and Stripes Forever", the 1973 Argonne Rebels had what was almost unquestionably the most technically complex musical program that had ever been performed by a drum and bugle corps up to that time.  Unfortunately, although things were changing under the new Drum Corps International, technical difficulty was not yet taken into consideration in judging a corps' performance. Additionally, the arrangements made getting the sounds to the fans in the stands in proper synchronization difficult at best, so that the field show was redesigned in mid-season by Drum Corps Hall of Fame senior corps designer Vince Bruni.  Although Argonne would finish in eleventh place at DCI World Championships at Whitewater, the season was a disappointment for the members whose early expectations had been so high.  Although future DCI Hall of Fame members Truman Crawford, Bernard Baggs, and Don Angelica addressed the corps immediately after the show and attempted to console the members, the corps would never recover from the blow.

With the Opies' departure from the corps and Sandra Opie's move from instructor to judge, the corps' brass would never again approach its excellence of the early 1970s.  In 1974, Argonne would drop to thirty-third at DCI.  The corps would recover somewhat, finishing twentieth in 1975 and eighteenth in 1976, but it would fall to the lower levels of Open Class in 1977, '78, and '79 and would cease operations following the 1979 season.  The Argonne Rebels would return as a Class A corps in 1983 but would leave the field for good following the 1984 season.  Although the Argonne Rebels have not been in field competition since 1984, its organization still exists to serve the alumni, since more than 3,000 youth from Great Bend and Barton County marched in the corps during its more than forty years of competition.

During the Summer of 2015, a special exhibit remembering the Argonne Rebels was presented at the Great Bend Public Library. It was created under the auspices of the Smithsonian Institution's “Museum on Main Street” program and is sponsored by the Kansas Humanities Council. Additionally, a reunion of Argonne Rebels alumni was held on July 11, and on the 14th, the annual Drum Corps International show "Drums Across Kansas" moved from Wichita to Great Bend and renamed the "March of Champions" to honor the two-time American Legion champion corps and its alumni.

Capital Regiment Drum and Bugle Corps 

The Capital Regiment Drum and Bugle Corps was a drum and bugle corps based in Columbus, Ohio, United States founded in 1999, and was a member of Drum Corps International. Although having competed in DCI's World Class (formerly Division I) from 2002 to 2006, the corps also competed in Open Class in 2009 before going inactive.  The Capital Regiment was one of six DCI corps in Ohio, the others being the Bluecoats, Cincinnati Glory, Glassmen, Limited Edition, and Marion Cadets.

Capital Regiment was founded in 1992 by founder and director Rick Bays. Bays ran a bingo operation as a fundraiser for several years before the corps created its first ensemble, an indoor drumline which competed in WGI in 1997 and 1998.

Capital Regiment debuted the drum and bugle corps in 1999, placing 9th at the Div. III championships that year. The corps placed 6th in Div. 3 in 2000. For 2001, the corps moved to Div. II, placing 4th in 2001 and 2nd in 2002. At the Drum Corps International Championships in 2002, the corps moved up to Drum Corps International Division I status.
In 2003, its first full year of Div. I competition, the corps played a program entitled "A Brave New World," featuring Dvorak's Symphony No. 9 in addition to several other pieces by various composers, including Alan Hovhaness. After a difficult season, the corps finished in 19th place.

The corps made tremendous strides in the 2004 season. For the first time, the corps played on B-flat instruments. Many new brass and visual staff members were hired, many alumni of The Cadets, including Chad Pence. The corps hired noted Cadets arranger Jay Bocook and Cadets drill designer Jeff Sacktig. The show, entitled "A Celebration of Life: Mind, Body, and Spirit," consisted of music by David Holsinger, reminiscent of the Holsinger shows performed by The Cadets in 1992 and 1993. The hornline reached a full 64 members for the first time in corps history, and the corps finished the season in 14th place.

The 2005 show was "Chiaroscuro: Symphonic Dances in Shades of Darkness and Light," based on "Chiaroscuro," a wind ensemble piece by Robert Sheldon. Chad Pence left as brass caption head and was replaced by Derek Gipson, another former Cadet. Design problems with the show as well as internal issues within the corps made for a difficult season, and the corps finished in 15th place, having been ranked as low as 18th during the season.

In 2006, the corps performed "Life Rhythms: Work, Rest, and Play," a show similar in concept to its previous two offerings, featuring music by Eric Whitacre and Philip Glass. Gordon Henderson replaced Jeff Sacktig as the corps' drill writer. Nearly the entire percussion staff was replaced, following the resignation of caption head Kevin Murphy at the end of the 2005 season. The new percussion staff, made up mainly by former members of Santa Clara Vanguard, was headed by Brian Stevens. Ralph Hardimon served as a percussion consultant to the corps. 2006 was the first time the corps used amplification. The corps experienced major organizational problems throughout the season and finished in 16th place.

In October 2006, an announcement was made that "the Board of Trustees of the Capital Regiment Drum and Bugle Corps has decided not to field a competitive corps for the 2007 Drum Corps International Summer Tour."  Capital Regiment became inactive for the 2007 marching season.  Although the organization had hopes of competing in 2008, Capital Regiment remained inactive for the 2008 season. On July 30, 2008, Capital Regiment announced that they were going to be active for the 2009 seasons and starting to accept membership applications, while announcing they would compete in Open Class.
In 2009 the corps returned to DCI competition.
In their return season, the corps finished 5th overall and 3rd in percussion and brass in Open Class Finals in Indianapolis, Ind. They also received their highest score ever achieved with an 89.95.

In 2009, the corps decided to make the decision to become "inactive" once again.

Coastal Surge Drum and Bugle Corps 

The Coastal Surge Drum and Bugle Corps was a drum and bugle corps based in Myrtle Beach, SC, United States founded in 2012, and was a member of Drum Corps International.

Coastal Surge had a successful exhibition season in 2013 to kick of the organizations short history. The following season DCI allowed Coastal Surge to enter competitively in the open class division. During their inaugural season as a DCI member corps, Coastal Surge completed a 4 week tour ending with their preliminary performance in Indianapolis. The 2014 season was the only season Coastal Surge competed in Drum Corps International. The corps one and done season was very successful with an open class finals appearance, finishing 12th in the division.

The drum corps began its 2015 season normally, but after a full month of spring training folded due to financial mismanagement. The largest known factor for financial hardship was the corps growth leading to anticipated rises in transportation costs. The only performance in 2015 was the family and friends performance in Edisto, SC.

Edmonton Strutters Drum and Bugle Corps

The Edmonton Strutters Drum & Bugle Corps was a modern style youth drum & bugle corps in Edmonton, Alberta that was founded in 1963. They had competed on and off over the years in Drum Corps International and Winter Guard International events. They had attempted to rebuild their program with the end goal of returning to Drum Corps International competition.

The Edmonton Strutters began in 1963, and originally operated as the Wink Strutters Drum and Bugle Band. The band toured playing half time games, at Edmonton Eskimos Football games, and various parades.

In 1968, the Wink Strutters Drum and Bugle Band reorganized, and were founded as a non-profit organization, becoming the Edmonton Strutters Drum Corps. Composed of young men and women ranging from age 12 to 21, the Corps averaged around 80 members. The Corps included a horn section, drums, color guard, rifles, and drum majors. Sopranos, mellophones, French horns, baritones and contrabass made up the brass section, while bass, snare, triplets, timpanis, and cymbals made up the drum section.

The first tours as a Drum Corps took the group to British Columbia, Washington, Idaho, Oregon, and back into Alberta. The Northwest Drum Corps Association provided most of their competition during touring dates. In 1974, with an extensive competition schedule, they traveled to Vancouver (Washington), Bellevue (Washington), Seattle (Washington), Hillsboro (Oregon), St. Albert, Red Deer, Calgary, and Edmonton (Alberta), Kerkrade (Holland), Rastede (Germany), and then to Great Falls (Montana), for the Northwest Drum Corps Association Class 'B' Championships. They took 10 first places, 3 second places and 1 third place.

The Edmonton Strutters continued to tour and compete throughout the US and Canada. In 1976, they reorganized once again. In 1977 the Edmonton Strutters Drum Corps, dressed in Red, Black and Chrome, marched on the field as the 1st Canadian Regiment. In 1984 the corps merged with the Calgary Cavaliers to become the 1st Canadian Cavaliers for one competitive season. In 1988, The Strutters name was once again adopted, and the corps began rebuilding with a new image and much more casual style.

The competitive spirit of the group maintained, and the Corps' experienced a banner year at Drum Corps International World Championships in 1990, where they earned a 9th-place finish. In 1991, many Edmonton Strutters members were able to take the field by joining Calgary-based Allegiance Elite for the competitive season.

After their 1990 season, The Strutters organization began to work toward maturity in their performance programs, resulting in increases to their overall score in DCI competition each year from 1992 to 1999, when they earned their highest score on record at Drum Corps International Finals. The 1999 Strutters took on a new look yet again, with modern white, green and black uniforms. The Edmonton Strutters drumline were the stadium drummers who performed at the 2001 IAAF World Track & Field Championships in Athletics, hosted in Edmonton. This event was broadcast to over 200 countries.

In 2004, the Edmonton Strutters joined with Allegiance Elite of Calgary to temporarily form a group called "Fusion". This "Fusion" of the two groups brought The Edmonton Strutters great success as they made their way into DCI World Championship Finals for the first time in their history.

The Edmonton Strutters performed for Queen Elizabeth and the Duke of Edinburgh during the royal visit for Alberta's centennial celebration in 2005.

In Spring 2005, the Strutters organization went temporarily inactive on the DCI circuit.  Beginning immediately afterward, re-organization began to facilitate a return to competition again. The Strutters maintained their program, offering drum lessons and a competitive Winter Guard International program throughout 2005–2007. In the fall of 2008, the Strutters introduced a new WGI program called "Movado" and competed for the first time at WGI's Power Regional in Nashville, TN, where they received 9th place, missing a finalist position by two spots.

Also in 2008, the Strutters experienced a change of leadership in their organization and an overhaul of their programs, resulting in a more modern organization. They began building by temporarily introducing a "Junior Corps" program, aimed at a younger audience to begin growing their programs again. Strutters' Junior Corps was well received in their city, winning a number of parades, and increasing in membership throughout the season.

In 2010, The Strutters became inactive as the organization restructured.

Esperanza Drum and Bugle Corps

The Esperanza Drum and Bugle Corps was a World Class (formerly Division I) drum and bugle corps based in San Diego, California and founded in the fall of 1999, and was a member of Drum Corps International (DCI).

Esperanza is one of several musical/performing arts programs incorporated under its parent organization, the Esperanza Performing Arts Association, along with a winter guard and an indoor percussion ensemble. During its history the organization has included the Esperanza de Luz winterguards (Open and World), Esperanza Winter Percussion Ensemble and the San Diego Brass and Percussion Ensemble (a community band). The Esperanza Organization has produced top quality national caliber championship and finalist programs in drum corps, winter guard and winter percussion.

Esperanza made its debut performance in June 2000 at the Esperanza Experience held at Southwestern College in Chula Vista, CA.

In its first year the corps toured Southern and Northern California ending its season in mid-July.  During its second year in 2001 the corps traveled out of California for the first time by competing in the DCI Southwestern Regional at San Antonio.  In 2002 the corps attended DCI Championships for the time and finished 6th in Division II.

Esperanza is a one-time DCI Division II/III (Now Open Class) Champion, in 2003 with a score of 95.6. 
In only its fourth year the corps won the DCI Division II Championships in Orlando, Florida.  This was the first time any corps from Southern California had won any DCI Championship title since 1972.

After winning the 2003 Drum Corps International Division II Championship, the Corps promptly moved up the ranks by entering the Drum Corps International Regional Division I Class. The Corps is the first DCI Division I drum corps from San Diego County. Their highest finish in Division I is 20th, in the 2005 season.

Esperanza Drum Majors have been:  2000-Dannie Baker, 2001-2003-Rich Chavez, 2004-Michael Wojcik, 2005-2006-Sean Zanganeh.

The corps founder is Alan Cox, who also served as its executive director until resigning in March 2007.  Further, in March 2007 the corps announced that it would not be fielding a competitive drum and bugle corps for the 2007 Drum Corps International competitive season.

Glassmen Drum and Bugle Corps 

The Glassmen Drum and Bugle Corps is a former World Class drum and bugle corps.  Based out of Toledo, Ohio, the corps was a member of Drum Corps International (DCI) and was a sixteen time DCI World Championship Finalist.

The Glassmen were inactive for the 2013 DCI season, and on November 29, 2013, it was announced that the Glassmen Drum and Bugle Corps Board of Directors had filed for bankruptcy protection to try to work out from under a major debt load. The Federal Bankruptcy Court officially dissolved the organization on March 14, 2014.  Almost immediately following the bankruptcy announcement, the Board of Directors of the Glassmen Alumni Association announced their intention to assist in resolving the difficulties and returning the corps to the field either as the Glassmen or as a new entity. The Alumni Association took possession of much of the corps' memorabilia and is storing it for the possible future rebirth of the corps. It was announced shortly before the beginning of the 2015 Drum and Bugle Corps season that The Glassmen were going to try and start up again for competition hopefully as soon as the 2016 Drum and Bugle Corps season. On March 1, 2016, it was announced that the corps would compete as a Sound Sports team during the coming summer season.

Kiwanis Kavaliers Drum and Bugle Corps

The Kiwanis Kavaliers Drum and Bugle Corps were a World Class drum and bugle corps based in Miami, Florida (previously twin cities of  Kitchener-Waterloo, Ontario). This corps was Canada's only World Class drum corps until it moved its headquarters to Miami after the 2006 season.  The Kiwanis Kavaliers have appeared in both Division I and Division II (now Open Class) competition throughout its history.

The highest championship finish by the corps was fourteenth place in 1996 and 1997.

The corps merged with several other Canadian drum corps over the years. However, the corps finally folded in 2008 after two years of inactivity.

Formerly headed by Doug Darwin, Russ McKechnie and John Cameron, the corps was founded in the fall of 1971 by Jack Turner as a member of Drum Corps International. At one point, Jack considered calling it "The Apple Corps," but didn't due in part to sponsorship by the local Kiwanis Club.

For the first 30 years of their existence, the Kiwanis Kavaliers enjoyed many years as a Canadian-based drum and bugle corps, achieving various levels of success.  The focus during the first ten years of the corps were parades and the local competition circuit in Southern Ontario under the Ontario Drum Corps Association (ODCA). along with about 30 other local drum corps.  They were generally considered a "Cadet" or "C" class corps at this time.  There were occasional trips to the U.S. during this time, including a trip to Disney World for the American Bicentennial in 1976.

In the winter of 1987 St. Andrews Drum and Bugle Corps of Cambridge, ON, merged with the Kavaliers. As a result, 1987 was the first year the corps made DCI A Class finals.  1987 through 1991 was spent getting established as an A class perennial contender.

In 1994 and 1995 the corps played increasingly sophisticated music composed by Pat Metheny.  Another merger happened in 1995 which pushed the corps further:  The Ventures Drum and Bugle Corps from the same hometown of Kitchener-Waterloo, ON had folded and their existing membership folded into the Kiwanis Kavaliers.  With their help, in 1995 the corps finished 2nd in Div II with a score of 95.6, just 0.8 behind first place.  And, the corps also won top brass and top percussion caption awards. It was at this time that the director, Doug Darwin, decided that the corps should go to Division I rather than rest on its laurels in Div II. The corps enjoyed competitive success through the late 1990s, but by the year 2000 membership was starting to diminish.

Following a trip to Europe in 2001, there was increasing concern inside of the organization about membership numbers, causing Doug Darwin and Tampa Bay Thunder director Jim Newman to increase collaboration between the two groups.  During 2002–2003, there were staggered camps held both in Florida and Waterloo, but during the years 2004-2005 all camps were held in Florida.

In 2006, the corps announced that it would not tour during the summer 2006 season due to a sudden change in administration and staffing.  In late 2006, the new corps administration announced their petition to return to a full Drum Corps International Tour.  However, on January 25, 2007, the administration announced that they would remain inactive, and a large portion of the Corps' equipment was stolen in Miami, Florida, the following month. The corps continued in an inactive state through 2008 before finally folding.

Knights Drum and Bugle Corps

The Knights Drum and Bugle Corps - known at different times as the Kewanee Black Knights, Geneseo Knights, or Quad City Knights - was an American drum and bugle corps originally based in Kewanee, Illinois, and later in Geneseo, Illinois and the Quad Cities region of Illinois and Iowa. The corps was founded in the 1930s, and during the 1950s and 1960s frequently participated in national competitions. In 1965-66 it was re-established as a youth group. After this the corps went through several relocations and name changes, and despite further competitive success it became inactive in 1995.

The history of the Knights began with a boy's fife and drum corps
formed in the 1930s sponsored by the American Legion Post in Kewanee,
Illinois. Within a short time the fifes were replaced by bugles and the
S.A.L. (Sons of American Legion) Junior Drum and Bugle Corps was formed. That
corps competed actively through 1942 when World War II took most of the
members.

After the war, interest in drum corps began again and veterans of the SAL corps returning from the war formed a senior corps in 1949. With
the help of the Kewanee American Legion, the corps raised money for
instruments and new uniforms and in 1951 the name Kewanee Black Knights was
chosen. The Black Knights became a familiar corps on the state and national
scene from 1951 to 1964. In addition to many local championships, the Black
Knights finished in the American Legion National finals (top 12) every year
from 1954 through 1961. When the senior group disbanded in 1964, the name and traditions were passed to a new youth group, the Black Knights junior corps, founded in the winter of 1965-66.

The corps became successful early on, making the
finals contest in the 1966 Illinois State Fair competition. 
The Black Knights of Kewanee dropped the Black from their name in 1972, and were the first corps to abandon the traditional cadet
uniform in favor of a "uniform costume" that depicted the name of the corps
as well as the music they were playing in their program. The corps was moved from Kewanee to Geneseo after the 1973 season. Costume changes during the show were introduced in 1979. In 1980 the corps won a national title at the US Open in Marion, Ohio. In 1983 the Corps was marching 122 members and was recognized as a viable competitor. They placed third in Drum Corps Midwest (DCM) 
finals, were 9th at Drum Corps International (DCI) regional prelims in Whitewater, and also came in among the leaders at DCI East in Allentown, Pa. It was decided to move the Corps to the Quad Cities in 1989. In 1991, The Knights merged with the Emerald Knights of Cedar Rapids Iowa, an experiment that lasted only one season. The Knights went inactive in 1995, their last competition being again the Illinois State Fair.

The Magic Drum and Bugle Corps

The Magic Drum and Bugle Corps  (originally Magic of Orlando) was an Open Class/Division I (now World Class) drum and bugle corps. Initially based in Orlando and later in Clermont, Florida, the corps was a member corps of Drum Corps International (DCI). The Magic was a six time DCI Division I World Championship Finalist and the 2002 DCI Division II World Champion.

In the wake of seven-time DCI Finalist Suncoast Sound Drum and Bugle Corps going inactive after the 1989 season, the Magic of Orlando was founded that autumn by staff members and supporters of the Tampa Bay area corps. The new corps made its debut to thousands of spectators at the 1990  Walt Disney World's Easter Parade. Playing music from the Disney film Fantasia, the corps toured and performed in fifteen states and Ontario and was named "Orlando's Musical Ambassadors" by the city. At the DCI World Championships in Buffalo, New York, the corps advanced to semifinals, placing 16th of 34 Division I (now World Class) corps. While the finish was very good for a first year corps, it fell short of the expectations of the many who had presumed that the corps would easily replace Suncoast Sound in DCI's Top Twelve.

The corps would fail to make DCI finals for three more seasons. Again performing music from Fantasia, Magic placed 18th of 29 corps at Dallas, Texas in 1991. Playing a Danny Elfman program in 1992, the corps finished in last place in its first 14 Division I contests, then ended the season 21st of 27 corps at DCI Championships in Madison, Wisconsin. In 1993, Magic of Orlando performed the first of five successive programs written and/or arranged for the corps by Robert W. Smith; Cirque de Magique, an adaptation of music from Cirque du Soleil, returned the corps to semifinalist status at Jackson, Mississippi, placing 16th of 29 corps.

In 1994, Magic would finally break into the ranks of DCI's Top Twelve finalists. Cirque De Magique, Part Deux would propel the corps to an 11th-place finish in Foxboro, Massachusetts. With Smith's Danse Animale, Magic would place 12th in 1995 at Buffalo, and rise to 8th at home in Orlando  with his Twelve Seconds to the Moon in 1996. 1997's show was part-Smith, part-others, and the corps placed 10th, again in Orlando.

A third season of Finals in Orlando saw the Magic falter; playing a program with no Smith compositions for the first time in six seasons, the corps just missed finals, finishing 13th. In 1999, Magic performed a program of Chuck Mangione music, and slumped further to a 14th-place finish in Madison.

Never truly financially stable, Magic of Orlando went inactive after the 1999 season to try to build a stronger fiscal base. In order to keep the name in front of the public, the organization marched a small corps called Micro Magic that did exhibition performances at a number of DCI shows and other events in 2000 and 2001.

When the corps returned to competition in 2002, DCI ruled that, under the rules, the corps had lost its Division I status and had to re-qualify by performing as a Division II corps. Marching a corps of well over one hundred members, Magic of Orlando then proceeded to win 29 consecutive Division II contests, including the DCI Division II World Championship in Madison with a score of 99.050, a record high score that stood until the discontinuation of divisional scoring in 2014. The corps then advanced to the Division I Championships, placing 11th in quarterfinals, 10th in semifinals, and 11th in finals.

In 2003, the Magic maintained its finalist status at DCI in Orlando, again placing 11th. However, mounting debt forced another reorganization and a move to Clermont, Florida, where the corps would also open a bingo hall. The 2004 season witnessed the corps once more falling from finals, placing 17th at DCI Finals in Denver, Colorado. In 2005, the corps would change its name to The Magic, but it would fail to make semifinals at Foxboro, ending the season in 21st place. The Magic managed to move up only one place in 2006, placing 20th at DCI in Madison.

After the 2006 season, The Magic's management announced that the corps would again be inactive for the 2007 season, with plans to return to the field in 2008. As it came time to begin working toward the 2008 season, it was once more announced that the corps would be inactive for the following season. So far, the corps had not yet returned to the field.

Source:

Mighty Liberators Drum and Bugle Corps
 
The Mighty Liberators Drum and Bugle Corps were a Class A (now Division II) competitive junior drum and bugle corps.  Based in Rochester, New York,    the Mighty Liberators performed in Drum Corps International (DCI) competitions.
The Liberators were one of the few predominantly-Black drum corps competing in the field of competition.

In 1972, a long-time Rochester-area parade corps, Scott's Sabers, folded after a long history under Lewis A. "Scotty" Scott.  One-time Sabers' member, Emmett Porter, who credited Scotty and the corps with changing his life for the better, held an executive position in Rochester's federally funded anti-poverty program,  Action for a Better Community (ABC). Mr. Porter was able to create the Mighty Liberators under the umbrella of ABC as a replacement for Scott's Sabers and to involve young people in a program that would provide positive influences and help to keep them away from the negative ones.

With the sponsorship of ABC, the new corps gained support from families, friends, and community organizations. New drums and bugles were purchased, as were new uniforms. The corps obtained buses for travel and, eventually, its own corps hall. At the time, Rochester was one of the hotbeds of drum corps activity, with several junior corps and at least two senior corps active, and many of the city's top arrangers and instructors stepped forward to aid the new corps.  With top instructors, new instruments, tailored uniforms, a renovated practice facility, and a small fleet of buses and trucks, The Mighty Liberators began a multi-year process to grow from a previously low key parade group into a competitive DCI field corps.

Initially, the corps restricted its competition performances to the New York-Pennsylvania-Northeast region. In 1975, the Mighty Liberators traveled to Marion, Ohio for the U.S. Open Class A competition, placing 35th of 42 corps from the Northeast, Midwest, South, and Canada. In 1976, the corps ventured to its first DCI World Championships in Philadelphia; they finished 17th of 25 corps in the Class A and All-Girl prelims.

In 1977, the Mighty Liberators carried out its most ambitious tour, traveling to Ohio, Nebraska, Wyoming, and the DCI Class A World Championships in Boulder, Colorado.. In the preliminary competition, the Mighty Liberators were 6th of 26 corps from throughout the United States and Canada and advanced to Finals, where they maintained their 6th place standing.

The Mighty Liberators never returned to the DCI Championships after 1977. They remained strictly a local corps until, in 1982, cutbacks in funding caused ABC to terminate its sponsorship, and the corps folded.

Oregon Crusaders Drum and Bugle Corps

The Oregon Crusaders Drum and Bugle Corps was a World Class competitive junior drum and bugle corps fielded by the Oregon Crusaders organization. Based in Portland, Oregon, the corps is a member of Drum Corps International and was the undefeated Division III champion in 2004 and the undefeated Open Class champion in 2012. On January 13, 2019, the Oregon Crusaders informed DCI that they would not be participating in the 2019 season.

The original Oregon Crusaders junior drum and bugle corps was founded in Oregon City in 1971 by brothers Ron and David Jones, with 15-year-old David as Corps Director and 16-year-old Ron as composer, arranger, and drill designer. The first-year corps consisted of a drill team with drumline, and is distinguished for suffering a bus breakdown as its 40 members were en route to the unit's only scheduled performance. The brothers reorganized in 1972, acquiring sponsorship of the Dickinson's Gourmet Preserves Company (now owned by Smuckers) and fielded as Dickinson's Oregon Crusaders. In 1973, the corps merged with the Imperial Cadets and marched as the 115 member Imperial Crusaders, but returned as the Oregon Crusaders in 1974 when the two corps split. After the Jones brothers aged out, the corps lapsed into inactivity.

In 1999, Rick Wise inaugurated a corps in Medford then known as the Southern Oregon Crusaders, though not affiliated with the original entity. In 2001, a collection of Southern Oregon Crusaders personnel along with a new group of staff members moved to reorganize the unit. Bill Perkins was named executive director, and Portland, Oregon was designated as the corps' new home.  The name was also shortened to, "Oregon Crusaders." From 2001 to 2003, the growing corps performed valiantly throughout the western US garnering the attention of the larger drum corps community despite fledgling membership and shoestring budget, which would include borrowed uniforms, horns and percussion equipment. In 2004, the corps traveled throughout the Western United States on its way to the DCI World Championships in Denver, where the corps won the Division III title, to complete an undefeated season.

In seven of the next eight seasons, the corps competed in Division II/Open Class.

In 2013, the corps was promoted to World Class.

On January 13, 2019, the organization announced that it would not be competing in the 2019 season.

The Oregon Crusaders organization also sponsored OC Indoor, a winter percussion ensemble that competed in the Northwest Association for Performing Arts and Winter Guard International circuits.

The Oregon Crusaders Independent Percussion Ensemble, organized in 2008, took first place at the 2009 WGI World Championships in the Percussion Independent A (PIA) and finished 3rd in 2010. In the 2011 season, the unit moved into World Class competition and has finished in WGI Independent World Class Finals in 2011, 2013, and 2014. Compass Rose, formerly the Oregon Crusaders Independent Colorguard, was a finalist in WGI Independent Open World Finals in 2014 and 2015.

Railmen Drum and Bugle Corps

The Railmen Drum and Bugle Corps (1939–1995) is a defunct competitive junior drum and bugle corps. Based in Omaha, Nebraska, the Railmen folded after the 1995 season.

The Railmen were formed in 1939 as the Union Pacific Drum and Bugle Corps. a musical activity for children of employees of the Union Pacific Railroad (UP) under director Chris Jensen. The group was to perform in parades and other events as representatives of the UP, and it made its first appearance in Omaha  during "Golden Spike Days," a four-day celebration of the world premier of the Cecil B. DeMille film, Union Pacific. Under Jensen, and his successor Ken Whittle,t he corps continued as a combination corporate public relations device and activity for employees children for forty-five years.

When Whittle assumed leadership in 1971, the corps started a gradual to transition to a competitive junior field corps. In 1983, the corps began accepting non-UP members, and the corps made its competitive debut in 1983, performing at a single show in Omaha. Becoming a touring corps in 1984, the Railmen performed at seven Drum Corps Midwest (DCM) and DCI shows. They made their first DCI Championship appearance at Madison in 1985, placing seventh of nineteen Class A corps.

The corps quickly became a crowd favorite, but the UP was dissatisfied with the corps' new identity. The budgets were cut back, and then the UP terminated its sponsorship in 1988. The corps converted to a non-profit youth organization under new director Shane Macklin.  However, fundraising in the Omaha area was difficult, since the public perception was that the corps was still sponsored by the UP. By 1994, the corps became unable to field a junior corps and marched a senior corps in a much-reduced season. The junior corps returned in 1995, but the small corps was able to finish only 14th of thirty-two corps at DCM and 13th of forty-one Division III corps at the DCI World Championships in Buffalo. With no funds and little success in raising more, the corps' board decided to fold the corps after the 1995 season.

Royal Crusaders Drum and Bugle Corps 
The Royal Crusaders was a competitive junior drum and bugle corps based in Finleyville, Pennsylvania and, later, Clairton, Pennsylvania, and represented the Pittsburgh metropolitan area. The corps competed in Drum Corps International and was a Top-12 Finalist in 1975. Their uniforms consisted of red, white and blue Cadet-style jackets, white slacks with a red stripe, and a blue hat with a white plume. The corps disbanded in the early 1980s.

The Royal Crusaders began in 1969 as a local corps from Finleyville, a small town in southwestern Pennsylvania. Later, in the 1970s, the corps purchased a corps hall in Clairton, Pennsylvania, a nearby industrial town and changed the name to "Pittsburgh" Royal Crusaders. Nevertheless, the corps most often was referred to as "Finleyville."

The corps scored well in DCI competitions where they were generally associate members, placing in the top 25 for eight straight years from 1972 to 1980. The Royal Crusaders' best year was in 1975 when they placed ninth in DCI competition and made the finals.

Although the Royal Crusaders had success in competitions, they were in serious financial trouble by the late 1970s. The corps collapsed after the 1980 tour, due to a lack of solid financial support. The Board of Directors attempted to field a corps in 1981, but ceased their efforts, due to a low number of members (particularly in the horn line) and a lack of sufficient funding. This marked the end of the original version of the corps, which disbanded after the 1980 season.

In 1982, a small group of younger members marched in local parades using the Royal Crusaders equipment, and were referred to as the Royal Crusader Cadets. Even this small effort, approximately the size of a modern-day mini-corps, folded after a year. By this time the Crusader's corps hall in Clairton was sold and the buses were disposed of.

Sky Ryders Drum and Bugle Corps

The Sky Ryders Drum and Bugle Corps was an Open Class (since renamed "World Class") competitive junior drum and bugle corps from 1955 to 1994. Based in Hutchinson, Kansas and later in DeSoto, Texas, the Sky Ryders was a member corps of Drum Corps International and a six time DCI World Championship Finalist.

The organization was first established as a junior corps in 1952 called the Lysle Rishel Post 68 Drum & Bugle Corps and led by director Ken Fairbrother, a former member of the Hawthorne Caballeros. In 1955, under the direction of H.D. "Prof" McCosh, the corps was reorganized and adopted the name Sky Ryders.  In 1957, they began winning competitions in Kansas, and in 1959 they started competing in American Legion national competitions. They won their first American Legion Kansas state Championship in 1959, repeated in 1960–62, and won another in 1964. In 1959, the corps also attended its first American Legion National championship, placing tenth of 24 junior corps. This was followed by American Legion Nationals finishes of 6th, 5th, and 4th the following three seasons and 3rd in 1964.

The corps experienced financial and membership issues in 1966, taking the season off after nearly disbanding. When it returned in 1967, it was largely with members of their feeder corps, the Jets, and with girls allowed into the brass and percussion sections rather than being restricted to the color guard.

In 1969, brass instructor John Simpson recruited Larry Kerchner to collaborate on the corps' music. The corps had a successful year, again winning the Kansas American Legion title and placing 7th at the American Legion Nationals in Atlanta, Georgia. From 1967 through 1971, the corps mostly confined its travel to Kansas and the surrounding states. At around that same time, the Sky Ryders were one of the first corps to make the switch from French horns to mellophones for mid-range voices.

In 1972, the Sky Ryders traveled to Whitewater, Wisconsin for the inaugural Drum Corps International World Championship, placing 20th of the 39 corps from across the US and Canada. The corps would not return to the DCI Championships until competing as a Class A corps at Boulder and Denver in 1977, where they finished in 3rd place. Up until that time, the Sky Ryders had always been a hometown corps, drawing its members exclusively from the Hutchinson area, but in 1977, the corps began to recruit from a wider area.  In 1978, the corps switched from Class A to Open Class and had increasing success, placing 31st in Denver that year and to 22nd  and 17th in Birmingham, Alabama the next two years. During that time, corps director George Tuthill and brass instructor John Simpson attracted many members from Oklahoma and Texas, and Kerchner's unique and melodic arrangements were popular with fans and judges.

In the early 1980s, Tuthill set out to get the Sky Ryders into DCI's elite Top 12. In 1981, they placed 14th in Montreal, Quebec at the first DCI Championships held outside the United States. In 1982, Tuthill's goal was accomplished with a 10th-place finish in Montreal's Olympic Stadium. The corps' huge rainbow flag, unfolded behind the corps during their show and displayed in the stands afterwards, and their closing number of "Over the Rainbow" quickly became Sky Ryders traditions.  In 1983, the Sky Ryders received particular attention performing Kerchner's Grammy-nominated jazz arrangement of "Home on the Range," and for the second year in a row, the corps placed in DCI's Top 12 with a 12th-place finish in Miami, Florida.

The corps dropped out of DCI Finals in 1984, placing 17th in Atlanta, Georgia. In 1985, the corps had a stronger year with a 15th-place finish at Camp Randall Stadium in Madison, Wisconsin, performing the first of two successive productions of "The Wizard of Oz." Starting in 1986, under the direction of alumnus Dale Antoine and a design team led by Tommy Keenum, the Sky Ryders returned to DCI's Top 12. Over the next three years, they entertained audiences with dramatized productions of the popular musicals "The Wizard of Oz," "West Side Story," and "The Sound of Music" and gained a reputation as "The Great Story Tellers." Their "Wizard of Oz" show in 1986 included elements such as a Wicked Witch riding a bicycle, gold lamé "yellow brick road" flags, and colorful guard costumes for the various characters in the film. They finished the year with the corps' highest placement of 9th in Madison.1987's "West Side Story" placed 12th as did 1988's "The Sound of Music", with both of those programs also containing costuming and actions that helped to tell the story.

After achieving popularity, the corps suddenly switched directions in 1989 with cadet-style uniforms and a more darkly themed show, including "March (from Symphonic Metamorphosis)" and selections from "Carmina Burana." The corps finished the season out of DCI Finals with a Semifinals tie for 14th place. The stylistic change and the fall from Finals were elements in the  financial difficulties the corps faced in 1990. From its roots as a hometown corps, the Sky Ryders had evolved into a corps with mostly out-of-state members, with the bulk of those members coming from Texas, so, in order to survive, the corps' leadership relocated the organization to De Soto, Texas, a suburb of Dallas.  After the challenges of the move to Texas, the corps finished the 1990 season in 19th place during DCI Semifinals in Buffalo, New York.
In 1991, the Sky Ryders once again regained DCI Top 12 status with a return to the corps' tradition of popular musicals, this time with Lerner and Loewe's "Camelot." The corps placed 12th in DCI Finals held in their new hometown of Dallas. The corps performed another popular Lerner and Loewe musical in 1992 with the Scottish-themed "Brigadoon," but during DCI's 20th Anniversary Championships in Madison, the corps only placed 15th in Semifinals.

In 1993, the Sky Ryders once more abandoned their successful formula for a "more contemporary show", including "Connotations" by Edward Gregson and "Symphony No. 2" by David Diamond, and the corps finished their last full season of competition with a placement of 20th in Jackson, Mississippi. Despite plans for a 1994 season, the corps' continuing financial difficulties resulted in bankruptcy and the disbanding of the corps. Although the corps had departed the scene, the efforts of the unit's director during its Texas tenure, Paul Proctor, saw that all of the corps' substantial debt was eventually paid off.

Suncoast Sound Drum and Bugle Corps

Suncoast Sound Drum and Bugle Corps (also known as "Suncoast") was an Open Class/Division I (currently World Class) competitive junior drum and bugle corps.  Based in Clearwater and Pinellas Park, Florida, Suncoast Sound was a member corps of Drum Corps International (DCI) and a seven-time DCI Open Class/Division I Finalist .

Suncoast Sound was founded in 1979 to allow more marching opportunities than afforded by Largo High School's Band of Gold, which had won the 1978 World Marching Band Championships in Europe. At the invitation of Queen Elizabeth, the new corps performed its first show in England for the Royal Court in place of the Band of Gold. Because of its European trip, the corps competed in only one other show before entering the DCI World Championships in Birmingham, Alabama, where it placed 40th of 43 corps.

Over the next few seasons, the corps improved each year, placing 30th in 1980, 21st in 1981, and 13th in 1982. In 1983, Suncoast won the Drum Corps South circuit championship and earned its first DCI Finals appearance, finishing in 6th place in Miami. The corps remained a DCI Finalist for the next six years with shows performed in their style known as "Sunjazz.". In 1985, Suncoast became the first DCI corps to perform an original musical program written for the corps, "Florida Suite" by Robert W. Smith, the first of three shows Smith wrote for the unit. However, the corps' expenses had consistently exceeded the funding raised by its bingo hall, and following the 1989 season, Suncoast Sound left the competition field in order to try to stabilize its finances. For the next two years, the organization was represented by two local parade and exhibition groups, the Suncoast Sound Cadets and the alumni Suncoast Gold.

After a two-year hiatus, Suncoast Sound returned to competition in 1992, fielding a Division III (up to 60 members) corps, placing 5th of 28 corps that season in Whitewater, Wisconsin and 6th of 21 the following year in Jackson, Mississippi. In 1994, the corps moved to Division II, finishing 5th of 18 corps in Lowell, Massachusetts. In 1995, Suncoast again fielded a Division III corps, but by July 6, in New Brunswick, New Jersey, after only three shows, the staff realized that sufficient funds were not available to complete the season, and the corps returned to Florida, with many of the members finding places in other corps.

In 1997 several staff members from the post-1989 years attempted to field a Division III corps named Synergy Sound, but its only scheduled competition was rained out, and Suncoast Sound became a part of drum corps history.

Sources:

Thunder Drum and Bugle Corps

The Thunder Drum and Bugle Corps was an Open Class competitive junior drum and bugle corps. Based in Spokane, Washington,  Thunder performed in Drum Corps International (DCI) competitions.

In January, 2004 Spokane businessmen Tony LeLateur and Kent Meredith decided to start a local drum and bugle corps. On March 1, 2004, the Spokane Drum Corps Association was founded as a non-profit organization with the purpose of supporting that corps. After local high school music teachers were recruited to the scheme, the Spokane Thunder made its debut in exhibition at the drum corps show in Woodburn, Oregon on June 23, less than six months after the initial decision to begin. Such is the legend of the corps' beginnings.

In 2005, Spokane Thunder undertook a two-week tour, competing as a Division III corps in Washington, Idaho, Oregon, and California.

The corps stepped up its participation in 2006. They competed in six shows in Washington, Oregon, and Idaho in eight days time. They then remained at home for several weeks before traveling to the Midwest, competing in Wisconsin and Indiana preparatory to their first DCI Division III World Championships in Madison, Wisconsin, where the corps placed 7th of 17 corps in prelims before rising to a 6th-place finish in the Championship Finals.

In 2007, the corps had only a single, late-season tour of Washington, Oregon, and California, ending at the DCI Division III Championships in Pasadena, California. Spokane Thunder finished 11th of 15 corps.

The new Open Class replaced Divisions II and III in 2008 as Spokane Thunder did a weekend of shows in Oregon and Utah before taking time off. The corps then made its second Midwest tour, competing in Iowa and Wisconsin on their way to the DCI Open Class World Championships in Michigan City, Indiana. In quarterfinals, they finished 6th of 23 corps, and advanced to semifinals, where they were 7th, a placement the corps would hold in Finals.

Economic conditions forced the corps to go inactive in 2009. Arrangements were made for corps members to march in DCI competition with Seattle's Cascades. It was during this period, though, that the corps recognized that it had become more of a regional activity than in its beginning. As a result, the corps' name was changed to the Thunder Drum and Bugle Corps.

Returning to the field in 2010, the Thunder toured Washington, Oregon, Idaho, Utah, and California for the next three seasons. In 2013, a trip to Wyoming and Colorado was added to attend DCI's Drums Along the Rockies regional competition.

In 2014, Thunder planned to return to the Midwest and the DCI World Championships after a five-year absence. However, in mid-May the corps suddenly ceased operations when the staff (composed primarily of area band directors) realized that, due to other obligations for the summer, too few of them would be available to support the tour. The corps resumed operations later in the year, held an audition camp for the 2015 season in December, and was returned to active status by DCI in February, 2015.

On December 6, 2016, the corps announced that, rather than fielding a corps for 2017, the organization would work, "...to put new leadership in place and to strengthen our financial position through sustainable funding and community sponsorship."

On September 1, 2017, the Greater Spokane Drum Corps Association announced that it would no longer field the Thunder Drum and Bugle Corps due to lack of adequate community support.

Velvet Knights Drum and Bugle Corps 
The Velvet Knights, a defunct Division I (now World Class) competitive junior drum and bugle corps. Based in Anaheim, California, the corps was a member of Drum Corps International.

The Velvet Knights had their origins in the Anaheim Explorer Scouts Drum and Bugle Corps, founded by Don Porter in 1958. Practicing on military installations, the corps and its members adopted a very military style, even when out of uniform. In 1963, the Explorer Scouts corps split into two new corps, the Anaheim Kingsmen and the Velvet Knights.

Success came quickly for the Velvet Knights; within two years, the corps won the 1965 California State American Legion Championship.  Throughout the remainder of the 1960s, the corps was a West Coast powerhouse, as were the Anaheim Kingsmen, with the two corps dominating the state championships. (The two corps often also saw members move from one corps to the other, since their corps halls faced each other on opposite sides of the street.)  The Velvet Knights started touring nationally by 1968, with mixed success; they made finals at both CYO Nationals and American Legion Nationals in 1970.  Although the corps was founded on the basis of maintaining tradition, it was still innovative; the corps was credited with being the first to perform with G-F bugles during an appearance at Chicago's Civic Opera House in 1968, and they pioneered electronics on the field in 1968, when they used an electronic bugle that could sound like several other instruments.

During the early 1970s, the Velvet Knights struggled to attract members, although they did manage to recruit many very good musicians, which tended to offset their smaller numbers.  The corps attended its first Drum Corps International World Championships at Whitewater, Wisconsin in 1973, finishing prelims in twenty-ninth place among forty-eight corps.  The corps did not, however, return to DCI until 1977, when they finished in 25th place in Denver, earning DCI Associate membership.  They repeated their placement in 1978, again in Denver. 1979, though, saw the Velvet Knights drop to 33rd place in Birmingham, Alabama.  In 1978, corps members were hired by the California Surf professional soccer team to create the sound of pounding surf on tympani with special electronics effects, and in 1979, the corps appeared in the feature film, "Americathon".

The Velvet Knights took 1980 off from the competition field, marching only a parade corps, while the staff developed a five-year plan to take the corps to DCI Finalist status.  When the corps re-entered the competition field, it was with a whole new, more relaxed attitude.  In 1982, the corps abandoned their traditional cadet-style uniforms for Hawaiian shirts, red Vans sneakers, and straw hats, and "2 COOL VK" was born, a laid-back, West Coast counterpart for the East Coast's highly entertaining Bayonne Bridgemen.  The scores and placements at DCI rose each year, thirty-third in 1981, twenty-first in 1982, seventeenth in 1983, and VK surpassed their goal by finishing in twelfth place and DCI Finals in 1984, the fourth year of their five-year plan.  The corps' success and its newfound, enormous popularity meant that the corps not only retained its members (with only about ten leaving for other corps in a five yer period) but also had potential members coming from all over the country to audition.  VK finished in eleventh place in 1985 and twelfth in 1986.  In 1987, former Bridgeman director Bobby Hoffman joined the Velvet Knights staff, and his imagination brought a new level of absurdity to the corps, which vaulted to a seventh-place finish that season and eighth the next, due to a high level of musicianship that was often masked by the corps' wild on-field antics.

VK achieved a status as "The Clown Princes of Drum Corps", and entertained crowds all across the United States and Canada.  However, the level of musicianship gradually declined.  The corps finished in eleventh in 1989, tenth in 1990, and dropped from Finals with a fourteenth-place finish in 1991.  VK returned to DCI's Top Twelve in 1992, placing in tenth, but that would be the corps' final appearance at DCI Finals.  The corps could only manage to place thirteenth to sixteenth in 1993 through 1996. The loss of a Finals position also lead to a drop in the average age of the corp so that within 3 years, the average age of the corps was 17. In its attempts to regain the Top Twelve, the Velvet Knights were acquiring debt by among other things paying more to staff members than their fund-raising bingo operation could cover.  1992 was the first year the corps started spending more than fundraising allowed, so that by 1994, each tour started with the corps already in debt up to $100,000. Along with the decline of Bingo as a fundraising source with the legalization of Indian Casinos in California, the corps finances were being stretched to a breaking point as early as 1993. Following the 1996 season, one staff member approached the IRS and challenged the practice, that was prevalent throughout drum corps at the time, of classifying staff members as independent contractors. The complaint brought about an audit by the Internal Revenue Service (IRS) just prior to the 1997 season.  The IRS determined that the staff members were employees, rather than contractors, and that not only was the corps responsible for paying federal taxes and medicare costs for that year, but also for several previous years, plus penalties and interest for prior non-compliance.  This decision brought about the immediate demise of the Velvet Knights Drum and Bugle Corps.

References

Defunct Drum Corps International member corps